CBBC is a British television channel for children.

CBBC may also refer to:

China-Britain Business Council: an organisation promoting trade and investment between the UK and China
Bella Bella (Campbell Island) Airport (Transport Canada id CBBC): an airport in British Columbia, Canada
Callable bull/bear contract: a kind of financial derivative
CBBC-FM 91.7, Canadian radio station in Lethbridge, Alberta on the CBC radio network

See also

 CBBC idents, identifiers for BBC's CBBC
 
 CBC (disambiguation)
 CCBC (disambiguation)
 CBCC (disambiguation)